Nicole Arendt and Ai Sugiyama were the defending champions, but Arendt chose not to participate and Sugiyama chose to participate in Sydney instead.

Nannie de Villiers and Irina Selyutina won the title, defeating Samantha Reeves and Adriana Serra Zanetti in the final, 6–2, 6–3.

Seeds

Draw

Draw

Qualifying

Seeds

Qualifiers

Lucky losers

Qualifying draw

References
Draw

2002 WTA Tour
2002 Canberra Women's Classic – 2